The 1994 United States House of Representatives elections in Virginia were held on November 8, 1994 to determine who will represent the Commonwealth of Virginia in the United States House of Representatives. Virginia has eleven seats in the House, apportioned according to the 1990 United States Census. Representatives are elected for two-year terms.

Overview

References

See also
 1994 United States House of Representatives elections

Virginia
1994
1994 Virginia elections